In Greek mythology, the name Locrus or Lokros (Ancient Greek: Λοκρός) may refer to:

 Locrus, the king of Locris and son of his predecessor King Physcius. He was the grandson of Amphictyon, son of Deucalion. Locrus became by Cabya the father of Opus, the mythical ancestor of the Ozolian Locrians. According to some, his wife was called Cambyse or Protogeneia. Locrus named the Lelegians Locrians after himself.
 Locrus, son of Zeus and Maera, the daughter of Proetus of Corinth. He is said to have assisted Zethus and Amphion in the building of Thebes. In some accounts, his mother was called Megaclite, daughter of Macareus and had a sister Thebe who married Zethus.
 Locrus, son of Phaeax and brother of Alcinous who emigrated to Italy where he married Laurina, the daughter of Latinus. Herakles at about that time was driving Geryon's beautiful cows from Erytheia. He arrived and was hosted kindly by Lokros. Latinus came to visit his daughter, saw and fancied the cows and drove them away. Discovering this, Herakles shot with his bow and killed him, and brought back the cows. Lokros, fearing Herakles might suffer something terrible at the hands of Latinus, who was strong in body and spirit, had hastened to the aid of his guest, having put on military gear. Herakles seeing him running and thinking he was someone rushing to support Latinus, loosed a shaft and killed him. After he learned he mourned loudly and conducted the rites for him. And when he had passed from among men he appeared to the people as a ghost and ordered them to establish a city by the tomb of Lokros. And the city keeps the name in honor of Lokros.
 Locrus, also a Parian statuary, of unknown date whose statue of Athena in the temple of Ares, at Athens, is mentioned by Pausanias.

Notes

References 

 Apollodorus, The Library with an English Translation by Sir James George Frazer, F.B.A., F.R.S. in 2 Volumes, Cambridge, MA, Harvard University Press; London, William Heinemann Ltd. 1921. ISBN 0-674-99135-4. Online version at the Perseus Digital Library. Greek text available from the same website.
Conon, Fifty Narrations, surviving as one-paragraph summaries in the Bibliotheca (Library) of Photius, Patriarch of Constantinople translated from the Greek by Brady Kiesling. Online version at the Topos Text Project.
 Lucius Mestrius Plutarchus, Moralia with an English Translation by Frank Cole Babbitt. Cambridge, MA. Harvard University Press. London. William Heinemann Ltd. 1936. Online version at the Perseus Digital Library. Greek text available from the same website.
 Pindar, Odes translated by Diane Arnson Svarlien. 1990. Online version at the Perseus Digital Library.
 Pindar, The Odes of Pindar including the Principal Fragments with an Introduction and an English Translation by Sir John Sandys, Litt.D., FBA. Cambridge, MA., Harvard University Press; London, William Heinemann Ltd. 1937. Greek text available at the Perseus Digital Library.
 Pseudo-Clement, Recognitions from Ante-Nicene Library Volume 8, translated by Smith, Rev. Thomas. T. & T. Clark, Edinburgh. 1867. Online version at theio.com

Children of Zeus
Demigods in classical mythology
Deucalionids
Corinthian characters in Greek mythology
Locrian characters in Greek mythology
Phaeacians in Greek mythology
Greco-Roman relations in classical antiquity
Corinthian mythology
Thessalian mythology